Marquinhos, whose real name Marcos Corrêa dos Santos (born 2 October 1971 in Rio de Janeiro) is a retired Brazilian footballer who played as a midfielder.

He was part of the Brazilian squad that took part at the 1993 Copa América.

External links
 Brazilian FA Database
Profile at Sambafoot.com

1971 births
Living people
Brazilian footballers
Brazil under-20 international footballers
Brazil international footballers
1993 Copa América players
Brazilian expatriate footballers
Association football midfielders
America Football Club (RJ) players
América Futebol Clube (RN) players
Esporte Clube Bahia players
Colo-Colo footballers
Expatriate footballers in Chile
CR Flamengo footballers
Guarani FC players
Esporte Clube Juventude players
Macaé Esporte Futebol Clube players
Madureira Esporte Clube players
Olaria Atlético Clube players
Sociedade Esportiva Palmeiras players
Associação Atlética Ponte Preta players
Associação Portuguesa de Desportos players
Ceilândia Esporte Clube players
Campeonato Brasileiro Série A players
Footballers from Rio de Janeiro (city)